Bachand is a surname. Notable people with the surname include:

 André Bachand (Progressive Conservative MP) (born 1961), Canadian politician, former member of the Progressive Conservative Party of Canada
 André Bachand (Liberal MP) (born 1934), Canadian politician, former member of the Liberal Party of Canada
 Claude Bachand (born 1951), Canadian politician, member of the Bloc Québécois
 Claude Bachand (MNA) (born 1956), Canadian politician, member of the Liberal Party of Quebec
 Kelly Bachand, American competitive shooter 
 Mario Bachand (born 1944), member of the Front de libération du Québec
 Matt Bachand (born 1976), American guitarist, member of metal band Shadows Fall
 Pierre Bachand (1835–1878), Canadian politician
 Qristina & Quinn Bachand, Canadian brother-sister musical duo
 Raymond Bachand (born 1947), Canadian politician, Quebec provincial cabinet minister